Ancistrochilus is a genus of the orchid family (Orchidaceae), comprising only 2 species.

Description
These two species are cool to hot growing orchids, found from tropical West Africa to Tanzania and Uganda. They grow on tree trunks and large branches at elevations between 500 and 1100 m.

These are sympodial epiphytic plants  with wide, characteristic conical or pyriform pseudobulbs, carrying two to three broad, acute, lanceolate leaves. These leaves are shed after growth has slowed.

Three to four large and attractive, fragrant  flowers, 8 cm across,  then appear from the base of the mature leafless pseudobulb in a pubescent inflorescence. The petals and sepals  are dark-colored, rose pink. The three-lobed lip is magenta. It ends in an elongated, narrow, curved projection.

Taxonomy
The name is derived from the Greek words  ankistron ("hook") and  cheilos ("lip"), referring to the form of the lip.

Species

References

 Christenson, E. A..  Ancistrochilus thomsonianus: the successful introduction of a rare African species.  Orchids 71(1): 30-32., 2002
 Mannens, P..  Niet zo vaak gezien in een collectie Ancistrochilus.  Orchideeen no.1: 9-10, 2002

 
Collabieae genera
Epiphytic orchids